McConnellsburg is a borough in Fulton County, Pennsylvania, United States. The population was 1,150 at the 2020 census. It is the county seat of Fulton County.

History
The McConnellsburg Historic District was recognized by the United States Department of the Interior in 1993 when it was listed in the National Register of Historic Places. The district consists of 144 structures that contribute to its historic character. Of notable meaning are the numerous taverns, inns, automotive garages and other travel-related structures still in existence today, which includes the Fulton House, the Fulton County Courthouse, and the log cabin of Daniel McConnell, who laid out the borough on April 20, 1786. It was further incorporated on March 26, 1814.

Economy
Currently McConnellsburg's largest economic driver is Oshkosh Corporation-owned JLG Industries, a major manufacturer of construction and maintenance access-related lifting equipment such as boomlifts, etc.

Geography
McConnellsburg is located in eastern Fulton County at  (39.932673, -77.995986).

The borough is located in the Ridge and Valley section of the Appalachian Mountains in southern Pennsylvania. It is situated in a  valley between Tuscarora Mountain to the east and Little Scrub Ridge and Meadow Grounds Mountain to the west.

U.S. Route 522 passes north–south through the center of town as Second Street. The main east–west street through the town center is Lincoln Way, or old U.S. Route 30 (the Lincoln Highway). U.S. Route 30 now bypasses the borough on a limited access highway to the north. The west end of Pennsylvania Route 16 is in McConnellsburg, following Lincoln Way and then the Buchanan Trail southeast out of town.

Demographics

As of the census of 2000, there were 1,073 people, 506 households, and 271 families residing in the borough. The population density was 2,998.2 people per square mile (1,150.8/km2). There were 551 housing units at an average density of 1,539.6 per square mile (591.0/km2). The racial makeup of the borough was 97.02% White, 0.84% African American, 0.19% Native American, 0.09% Asian, 0.09% Pacific Islander, and 1.77% from two or more races. Hispanic or Latino of any race were 0.56% of the population.

There were 506 households, out of which 22.9% had children under the age of 18 living with them, 37.7% were married couples living together, 12.1% had a female householder with no husband present, and 46.4% were non-families. 42.1% of all households were made up of individuals, and 21.3% had someone living alone who was 65 years of age or older. The average household size was 2.01 and the average family size was 2.72.

In the borough the population was spread out, with 19.9% under the age of 18, 6.9% from 18 to 24, 24.9% from 25 to 44, 20.4% from 45 to 64, and 28.0% who were 65 years of age or older. The median age was 44 years. For every 100 females there were 80.0 males. For every 100 females age 18 and over, there were 75.9 males.

The median income for a household in the borough was $25,987, and the median income for a family was $33,125. Males had a median income of $28,478 versus $20,577 for females. The per capita income for the borough was $16,884. About 14.9% of families and 17.3% of the population were below the poverty line, including 31.7% of those under age 18 and 14.9% of those age 65 or over.

Education
 Central Fulton School District

Media 
Newspaper: The Fulton County News

Television 

McConnellsburg, and the rest of Fulton County, are located in the Washington, D.C. television market, but also are covered by Altoona and Harrisburg channels-but stations are difficult to catch with an antenna, requiring cable or satellite. An antenna can, however, sometimes get stations based out of the Hagerstown sub-market, such as WDVM and WWPB.

Local stations include

ABC: WJLA, WHTM

NBC: WRC, WGAL

CBS: WUSA, WHP

Fox: WTTG, WPMT

The CW: WDCW, WHP-DT3

MyNetworkTV: WDCA, WHP-DT2

Radio
 WEEO-FM, 103.7 - talk radio format
 WWCF-FM, 88.7 - Adult album alternative format

Notable person
Toby Shaw, news presenter

References

External links
 McConnellsburg Borough - County of Fulton, PA

County seats in Pennsylvania
Populated places established in 1786
Boroughs in Fulton County, Pennsylvania
1814 establishments in Pennsylvania